Declan Moore may refer to:
 Declan Moore (cricketer)
 Declan Moore (rugby union)